The Roman Catholic Diocese of Menevia is a diocese of the Catholic Church in Wales. It is one of two suffragan dioceses in the ecclesiastical province of Cardiff and is subject to the Archdiocese of Cardiff.

History
On 12 May 1898, the Apostolic Vicariate of Wales was elevated to diocesan status and had its seat at the Cathedral Church of Our Lady of Sorrows in Wrexham  until 1987 when the Diocese of Wrexham was created.The Diocese of Menevia currently covers the area roughly that of the ancient Diocese of St Davids. ("Menevia" was the Roman name for St Davids.) The diocese is currently led by an Archbishop Mark O'Toole who is also Archbishop of Cardiff.

The sixth century bishop St Ismael is honoured on 16 June.

Timeline
 29 September 1850: Universalis Ecclesiae: The Roman Catholic Church in Wales is split between the Diocese of Shrewsbury in the north and the Diocese of Newport and Menevia in the south.
 4 September 1860: Belmont Abbey, Herefordshire, the cathedral priory of the Diocese of Newport and Menevia is consecrated.
 4 July 1895: The Diocese of Newport and Menevia splits. Glamorgan, Monmouth and Herefordshire become the Diocese of Newport. The rest of Wales, including North Wales from the Diocese of Shrewsbury, becomes the Apostolic Vicariate of Wales.
 12 May 1898: The Apostolic Vicariate of Wales become the Diocese of Menevia with Wrexham Cathedral as its pro-cathedral.
 7 February 1916: The Diocese of Newport becomes the Archdiocese of Cardiff and it is decided that St David's church in Cardiff would become its cathedral.
 12 March 1920: St David's Cathedral, Cardiff is officially made the metropolitan cathedral of the Archdiocese of Cardiff.
 12 February 1987: The Diocese of Menevia is split. The north becomes the Diocese of Wrexham with its cathedral remaining in Wrexham. The south remains the Diocese of Menevia and sets up Swansea Cathedral.

Details
In 2007, there were 27,561 Catholics in the diocese which was served by 34 diocesan priests, 19 religious priests, 9 non-ordained male religious and 100 female religious.  There are 34 Catholic educational institutions in the diocese, including three secondary schools: 

 St Joseph's Catholic School and Sixth-Form Centre, Port Talbot

 St John Lloyd Catholic Comprehensive School, Llanelli
 Bishop Vaughan Catholic School, Swansea

Founded in 1965, St Joseph's School was the first Catholic comprehensive school in Wales.

The geographic remit consists of the City and County of Swansea, Neath and Port Talbot, and the traditional counties of Brecknockshire, Cardiganshire, Carmarthenshire, Pembrokeshire and Radnorshire - an area of  roughly.

The cathedra is located at St Joseph's Cathedral, Swansea.  Situated within the diocese is the Welsh National Shrine of Our Lady of Cardigan at Cardigan.

Bishops

Ordinaries

Francis Edward Joseph Mostyn † (4 July 1895 – 7 March 1921 appointed archbishop of Cardiff)
Francis J. Vaughan † (21 June 1926 – 13 March 1935 died)
Michael Joseph McGrath † (10 August 1935 – 20 June 1940 appointed archbishop of Cardiff)
Daniel Joseph Hannon † (15 March 1941 – 26 April 1946 died)
John Edward Petit † (8 February 1947 – 16 June 1972 retired)
Langton Douglas Fox † (16 June 1972 – 5 February 1981 resigned)
John Aloysius Ward, OFM Cap † (5 February 1981 succeeded – 25 March 1983 appointed archbishop of Cardiff)
James Hannigan † (13 October 1983 – 12 February 1987 appointed bishop of Wrexham)
Daniel Joseph Mullins † (12 February 1987 – 12 June 2001 retired)
John Mark Jabalé (12 June 2001 – 16 October 2008 retired)
Thomas Matthew Burns (16 October 2008 – 11 July 2019 retired)
Mark O'Toole (Appointed 27 April 2022. Diocese merged with the Archdiocese of Cardiff in persona Episcopi. Installed on 23 June 2022)

Coadjutor Bishops
John Peter Mark Jabalé, O.S.B. (2000-2001)
John Aloysius Ward, O.F.M. Cap. † (1980-1981)

Auxiliary Bishop
Langton Douglas Fox † (1965-1972), appointed Bishop of Menevia.

Other priest of this diocese who became bishop
Peter Malcolm Brignall (priest here, 1978–1987), appointed Bishop of Wrexham, Wales in 2012

Deaneries 
There are a total of five deaneries in the Diocese of Menevia, all of which cover several churches in that area, overseen by a dean.

The deaneries are:

 Carmarthen Deanery
 Llandrindod Wells Deanery
 Pembroke Deanery
 Port Talbot Deanery
 Swansea Deanery

See also 
 Catholic Bishops' Conference of England and Wales
 Our Lady of Cardigan
 Caldey Abbey
 Chapel of St Non

References

External links
Catholic Encyclopedia article
GCatholic.org
Diocese of Menevia

 
Organisations based in Swansea
Religious organizations established in 1898
Roman Catholic dioceses and prelatures established in the 19th century
Roman Catholic Ecclesiastical Province of Cardiff